Failbook+ is a comedic blog website which primarily focuses on screenshots of humorous genuine status updates uploaded onto Facebook, although the website has acknowledged expansion into other Social Networking websites, such as Google+, Twitter, and others, with messages being sent from users who often have their identities removed.  The first "fail" was placed onto the website on December 3, 2009. It is often regarded as a sister website to Fail Blog, a website which focuses on people failing at tasks that they attempt. Failbook is a subdivision of I Can Has Cheezburger?, which is owned by Pet Holdings Incorporated.

See also
Fail Blog
Lamebook

References

External links

"LOLspats: Cheezburger Network Sues Failbook.com for 'Confusing and Defrauding Our Users'" from Fast Company
"Failbooking.com is now Failbook.com" from Dot Weekly
"ICanHasLawsuit? Pet Holdings Sues Other Site For Framing Failbooking With Better Domain Name" from Techdirt
"LOLcats, Failbook owner talks at UW" from The Badger Herald

American comedy websites
Internet humor
Photoblogs
Internet properties established in 2009